The 2017 Perth Darts Masters was the fourth staging of the tournament by the Professional Darts Corporation, as the sixth entry in the 2017 World Series of Darts. The tournament featured 16 players (eight PDC players facing eight regional qualifiers) and was held at the HBF Stadium in Perth, Western Australia between 25–27 August 2017.

Michael van Gerwen was the defending champion after winning 2016 edition, but did not compete as he wished not to be included in the draw after his wife was due to give birth.

Gary Anderson won the title after defeating Raymond van Barneveld 11–7 in the final. Anderson won in his fifth World Series Event final appearance his fifth title, making it a 100% winning ratio in Event Finals.

Prize money
The total prize fund was £60,000.

Qualifiers

The eight invited PDC representatives, sorted according to the World Series Order of Merit, were:

  Gary Anderson (winner)
  Phil Taylor (quarter-finals)
  Peter Wright (quarter-finals)
  James Wade (semi-finals)
  Daryl Gurney (semi-finals)
  Raymond van Barneveld (runner-up)
  Simon Whitlock (quarter-finals)
  Michael Smith (quarter-finals)

The regional qualifiers are:

Draw

References 

Perth Darts Masters
Perth Darts Masters
World Series of Darts
Sports competitions in Perth, Western Australia
2010s in Perth, Western Australia